Sergio Véjar (11 October 1928 – 15 February 2009) was a Mexican cinematographer, film director and screenwriter. His 1963 film Los signos del zodiaco was entered into the 3rd Moscow International Film Festival.

Selected filmography
 Los signos del zodiaco (1963)
 La Casa del Pelícano (1974)
 La Jaula de Oro (1987)

References

External links

1928 births
2009 deaths
People from Colima
Mexican film directors
Mexican cinematographers
Mexican film producers
20th-century Mexican screenwriters
20th-century Mexican male writers